Pariyar is a surname of Nepalese people belonging to the Damai caste.

Notable includes
Jiwan Pariyar is a Nepali politician 
Kalpana Pariyar, Nepalese professional Shooter
Laxmi Pariyar is a Nepali politician
Prem Pariyar Nepalese child singer
Raju Pariyar born 1980) singer from Nepal. 
Shiva Pariyar, Nepali singer
Sujata Pariyar is a Nepalese politician
Surjay Pariyar (born 1992) is an Indian professional footballer
Tilak Pariyar is a Nepalese politician
Vimal Pariyar (born 1986) is a former Indian professional footballer
Yash Kumar ( Suresh Kumar Nepal Pariyar ),

References

Ethnic groups in Nepal
Nepali-language surnames
Khas surnames